Rogue Island is an island of Bermuda that is a nature reserve.

References

Islands of Bermuda
St. George's Parish, Bermuda